The 14th Ryder Cup Matches were held 13–14 October 1961 at Royal Lytham & St Annes Golf Club in Lytham St Annes, England. The United States team won the competition by a score of 14 to 9 points.

At the 1959 Ryder Cup there had been informal discussions between the US and British PGAs about changing the format of the contest.  In April 1960 the British PGA made a formal proposal. The suggestion was that, for 1961, matches would be reduced to 18 holes and that there would be two sets of matches each day; two sets of foursomes on the first day and two sets of singles on the second. The pairings for the foursomes and the order of play in the foursomes and singles could be changed for the second set of matches. They also proposed that, for 1963, the match should be extended to three days with two set of four-ball matches on the extra day. By August 1960 the US PGA had agreed to the proposal as it related to the 1961 event, the change being formalised later that year.

Format
The Ryder Cup is a match play event, with each match worth one point.  The format used in 1961 was the first change from that used since the inaugural event in 1927. Instead of 12 matches of 36 holes, there were 24 matches of 18 holes. The schedule of play in 1961 was as follows:
Day 1 (Friday) — 8 foursomes (alternate shot) matches, 4 each in morning and afternoon sessions
Day 2 (Saturday) — 16 singles matches, 8 each in morning and afternoon sessions
With a total of 24 points, 12 points were required to win the Cup. All matches were played to a maximum of 18 holes.

Teams
Source: 

The British team was determined using the 1961 Order of Merit with the 1961 Open Championship and News of the World Match Play winners receiving automatic places. The first qualifying event was the Schweppes PGA Close Championship in early April with the Carling-Caledonian Tournament in early August being the final one. With Arnold Palmer winning the Open, nine players qualified after the Carling-Caledonian Tournament: O'Connor, Hunt, Alliss, Bousfield, Coles, Rees, Panton, Moffitt and Haliburton. Weetman was in tenth place. Weetman gained his place when three of the four semi-finalists in the News of the World Match Play were already in the team and the fourth (Peter Thomson, an Australian) was ineligible. Rees was chosen as the captain.

Arnold Palmer, age 32, competed in his first Ryder Cup. He recorded two wins in pairs and a win and a half in singles.

Friday's matches

Morning foursomes

Afternoon foursomes

Saturday's matches

Morning singles

Afternoon singles

Individual player records
Each entry refers to the win–loss–half record of the player.

Source:

Great Britain

United States

References

External links
About.com: 1961 Ryder Cup

Ryder Cup
Golf tournaments in England
Sport in the Borough of Fylde
Lytham St Annes
Ryder Cup
Ryder Cup
Ryder Cup
1960s in Lancashire